Bhalui is a village (Rajapakar Vidhan Sabha constituency) in Vaishali district, Bihar, India. According to census website all blocks in Bihar are named as C.D.Block (community development blocks). It has a population of 120,221 according to 2001 census. Hindi is the official language mainly used in Bhalui.

Block office
Bhalui Rajapakar Vaishali.

Schools and College
Prathmik Vidyalya Bhalui and Sant Kabir College Bhalui (SKC).

Major Roads
NH-103
SH-49

References

Villages in Vaishali district